José Luís Grant Martínez (born 8 April 1983) is a Honduran  football player, who currently plays for Real Juventud.

Club career
He won the rookie of the year for 2005-2006 season. In May 2007, Grant was amid controversy after he allegedly signed with both Olimpia and F.C. Motagua. A tribunal decided in favour of Motagua.

Nicknamed Puma, he later had to return to his previous team, Victoria, since Motagua did not complete the payment of the loan. He was on loan to Vida for the Clausura 2008 from their cross-city rivals Victoria. In summer 2008, he joined Real Juventud. In December 2012 Victoria announced Grant was in training with the club.

International career
Grant made his debut for Honduras in a September 2006 friendly match against El Salvador, coming on as a second-half substitute for Julio César de León. The game proved to be his final international as well.

Personal life
His father was Ricardo Grant and his mother is Juliana Martinez.

Honours and awards

Club
F.C. Motagua
Copa Interclubes UNCAF (1): 2007

References

External links

1983 births
Living people
People from La Ceiba
Association football midfielders
Honduran footballers
Honduras international footballers
F.C. Motagua players
C.D. Victoria players
C.D.S. Vida players
C.D. Real Juventud players
Liga Nacional de Fútbol Profesional de Honduras players